Forever Young is a 1983 film (US release 1986) written by Ray Connolly and directed by David Drury for Channel 4 as part of their First Love series.

Plot
Jimmy (James Aubrey) and Michael (Nicholas Gecks) were best friends at school in the 1960s. They played guitar and sang together and dreamed of becoming the next Lennon and McCartney or Simon and Garfunkel. Their partnership ended when Michael decided to become a priest. Jimmy eventually became a university lecturer of English literature. The two meet again twenty years later when Jimmy sees posters advertising one of Michael's regular fundraising concerts in his church hall. At first, the two are delighted to see each other, but they gradually remember the events that drove them apart.

The events are shown in flashback. At one of their concerts, Jimmy (played in flashback by Julian Firth) catches sight of Maureen (Oona Kirsch) and tells Michael (Jason Carter) that he has fallen in love. During a strip game involving a music quiz, Maureen becomes topless, which attracts Michael's attention and eventually the two of them make love after one of Jimmy and Michael's concerts.

The events of the past are mirrored in the present day. Father Michael is good friends with Mary (Karen Archer, previously in Giro City) and her son Paul (Liam Holt), who idolises him and wants to become a priest himself. However, Jimmy and Mary get together. The IMDB entry for Forever Young describes this as an act of revenge by Jimmy. Paul discovers them making love and runs away to the church. Michael insists that Paul return home. Thus Michael loses the friendship of Jimmy, Karen and Paul and at the end of the film he is shown bereft.

Cast 
 James Aubrey 	    ... 	James
 Nicholas Gecks 	... 	Father Michael
 Karen Archer 	    ... 	Mary
 Alec McCowen      ...     Father Vincent
 Rudi Davies       ...     Suzie (as Ruth Davies)
 Philip McGough    ...     Ian
 Kathy Burke       ...     Girl
 James Wynn       ...      Brother
 Michael Sundin    ...     Peter
 Nick Berry        ...     Boy At School
 Carol MacReady    ...     Brenda

Music
The film is full of music from the 1950s. The lyrics to the theme music to the film, the song Forever Young, were written by Ray Connolly to a tune based on Farewell to Stromness by Peter Maxwell Davies.

Box Office
Goldcrest Films invested £420,000 in the film and made £514,000 earning them a profit of £94,000.

References

External links
 Forever Young at the Internet Movie Database

1983 television films
1983 films
Goldcrest Films films
Channel 4 television films
British television films
Films directed by David Drury
1980s English-language films